David Starčević (1840 – November 18, 1908) was Croatian politician and prominent member of the Party of Rights.

Starčević was born in Žitnik near Gospić in 1840. He is nephew of Ante Starčević, one of the most significant Croatian politicians who was one of the founders of the Party of Rights. He attended gymnasium in Zagreb, but in 1871 he was expelled due to suspicion that he was involved in the Rakovica Revolt, started by other founder of the Party of Rights, Eugen Kvaternik. After he was expelled from the Zagreb gymnasium, he attended Eötvös Loránd University in Budapest and gained doctorate in law. In 1873 he started to work as a lawyer in Jastrebarsko. He became one of the most active members of the Party of Rights after party's activity was renewed in 1878. In 1881 he gained seat in Sabor, Croatian parliament. He was fierce opponent of Károly Khuen-Héderváry, who was at the time Ban of Croatia which made him the most popular in the opposition. On 5 October 1885 he attacked Héderváry by grabbing his neck and one of his party colleagues kicked him in his breeches. The event was very popular in Croatia and Starčević boasted with this action. Héderváry denied such event and Starčević was sentenced for six months in prison because of slander, Starčević was also expelled from parliament. After conflict in the Party of Rights, he joined to the "Fatherland Faction" (Domovinaši) led by Fran Folnegović, but in 1895 he joined Pure Party of Rights led by Josip Frank; the faction was called Frankovci. Soon, Starčević left the political life. He died in Jastrebarsko on 18 November 1908.

References
Notes

Bibliography
 

1840 births
1908 deaths
People from Gospić
19th-century Croatian people
Party of Rights politicians
Representatives in the Croatian Parliament (1848–1918)
University of Pécs alumni
People expelled from public office